Fernando "Pecoso" Castro Lozada (born 11 February 1949) is a Colombian football manager and former player. He has won two Primera A titles as a manager, most recently in 2015 with Deportivo Cali. He most recently managed América de Cali in the Colombian Categoría Primera A.

Career 
Castro obtained his first win working as the Technical Director of the Deportivo Cali, in the 1995/96 season; with them he broke a bad series of 22 years without wins for the team "Azucarero".

Later, "El Pecoso" (Freckle Face) stood out in his work for another big name of Colombian football, Independiente Santa Fe, the club that he directed from 1999 to 2001. In the 2000 season, he took the team to the championship finals, contending the title against the America of Cali (eventually the champions), Junior of Barranquilla and Sports Tolima.

Castro also directed América de Cali, between the years 2002 and 2003. This was a team with which he had a big campaign in the Copa Libertadores 2003, leading the "Escarlata" (The Scarlet) to the semi-finals, in which the team was knocked out by the Boca Juniors of Argentina (eventually the champions).

In his second stage as the head of "Los Cardenales", in spite of having an exceptional performance in the Tournament Opening, serious differences with the surroundings of the club motivated his exit in 2008. He was replaced by the Coach Hernán Darío "Bolillo" Gómez.

In the second semester of 2010 he signed a contract with the Deportes Quindío team, and in spite of his economic limitations and staff to run an acceptable campaign, he brought the team to the quadrangular semi-finals of the tournament of that year. After the 2011 and 2012 seasons, he was not able to make any remarkable achievements, and he was driven to his dismissal due to economic problems, constant payroll cuts, and differences with the board of directors and some players.

Five days into the 2014 season's closing tournament, Castro took control of the Atlético Huila, replacing the technical director Virgilio Puerto, who had been fired from the team due to bad results. Under his control for the rest of the competition, the Atlético Huila would reach a total of six victories, five ties and only one defeat, achieving a total of twenty-three points in front of the four teams before they changed technical directors, which put them in the quadrangular tournament semi-finals. During the quadrangular semi-finals, against the leader of the first Independiente Santa Fe phase and the current champions Atlético Nacional, Castro's Atlético Huila gained eleven points. They had the possibility to compete in the finals but five minutes before the end of the last game, the Independiente Santa Fe were able to tie the game and surpass them in points only for having occupied a higher position in the first phase of the tournament.

After having finalized his commitments with Atlético Huila, he terminated his agreement with the club in December 2014 so he could be hired for the 2015 season by the Deportivo Cali, the team that had returned like a helmsman after twelve years. His return to the Deportivo Cali was marked by a brief controversy due to contractual disputes with his old club, since the huilense team did not arrive at an agreement with the Deportivo Cali to cease the agreement that Castro had until June 2015. Due to all this, he was banished from the field at the start of the league game, and had to direct from the grandstand until the legal lawsuit was resolved. After remaining in third place in the confrontation phase between all the teams of the 2015 tournament opening, the Deportivo Cali, directed by Castro, moved to the second phase of the competition, where they were able to surpass the Atlético Nacional, resulting in their instant elimination in the quarter-finals. Playing against the club the Millonarios in the semi-final resulted in facing the Deportivo Independiente Medellín for the title, where they would win and achieve the ninth title for the Deportivo Cali and the second title in his professional career.

The trainer from Manizales has also headed to the teams Cúcuta Deportivo, Envigado FC, Independent Medellín, Millonarios and Once Caldas, but he has not had as much success with these groups.

Colombia National Football Team 
With the Colombia national team he played 15 international games. He played 7 friendly games, 4 games in the America Cup 1979 and 4 eliminatory games in 1981.

Participations in American Cup

Participations in Eliminations to the World Cup

Clubs

As a player

As a coach

Winning record

As a trainer

References

External links
 

Millonarios F.C. managers
Once Caldas managers
Colombian football managers
América de Cali managers
Cúcuta Deportivo managers
Deportivo Cali managers
Independiente Santa Fe managers
Colombian footballers
Colombia international footballers
Deportivo Cali footballers
Once Caldas footballers
Independiente Santa Fe footballers
People from Manizales
1949 births
Living people
Association football defenders
Independiente Medellín managers
Atlético Huila managers